North Quay is an approved office development, consisting of three towers on the north side of Canary Wharf in London. The developer is Canary Wharf Group and the architect is Cesar Pelli.

The original plan was for three towers of 18, 38 and 40 floors. In 2017, new plans were submitted for a development of four towers of 30 to 67 floors.

Planning
In March 2003 Norquil Ltd submitted a planning application to Tower Hamlets for two towers and a central link building at land known as Shed 35 North Quay, Aspen Way, London, E14.

The application were approved on 12 January 2007 including a condition that the development shall commence within 10 years of that date. A press release was posted on the official Canary Wharf website on 12 January..

The site was an open-air car park managed by Britannia Parking until June 2006, following which it has since been occupied by construction equipment for the Crossrail station that is being built in the adjacent West India North Dock. This has prevented any construction of the three towers from proceeding.

In 2017, new plans were submitted for a development of four towers of 30 to 67 floors.

See also
Canary Wharf
Tall buildings in London

References

External links
North Quay on Skyscrapernews.com

Canary Wharf buildings
Skyscrapers in the London Borough of Tower Hamlets
Buildings and structures in the London Borough of Tower Hamlets
Proposed skyscrapers in London